Thermococcus gammatolerans is an archaea extremophile and the most radiation-resistant organism known to exist.

As reported in 2003 the type strain EJ3T was taken from a submarine hydrothermal vent in the Guaymas Basin off the coast of Baja California at a depth of about 2,600 m by submersible Nautile during the 1991 Guaynaut cruise. Thermococcus gammatolerans thrives in temperatures between 55 and 95 °C with an optimum development around 88 °C.  
Its optimal growth pH  is 6, favoring the presence of sulfur (S), which is reduced to hydrogen sulfide. It is the organism with the strongest known resistance to radiation, supporting a radiation of gamma rays from 30,000 gray (Gy).

Along with the genera Palaeococcus and Pyrococcus, Thermococcus belongs to the Thermococcaceae family, sole family of the Thermococci (called "Protoarchaea" by Cavalier-Smith), a class in the phylum Euryarchaeota of Archaea.
Thermococcus species live in extremely hot environments such as hydrothermal vents with a growth optimum temperature above 80 °C. Thermococcus and Pyrococcus (literally "ball of fire") are both chemoorganotrophic anaerobic required. Thermococcus spp. prefer 70–95 °C, whereas Pyrococcus species prefer 70–100 °C.

The resistance to ionizing radiation of T. gammatolerans is enormous. While a dose of 5 Gy is sufficient to kill a human, and a dose of 60 Gy is able to kill all cells in a colony of E. coli, Thermococcus gammatolerans can withstand doses up to 30,000 Gy, and an instantaneous dose up to 5,000 Gy with no loss of viability.

History 

Thermococcus gammatolerans was discovered in 2003 in samples collected from a hydrothermal chimney at the Guaymas Basin about 2,000 m deep off the coast of California, (27° 1' N, 111° 24' W).

Mechanisms of resistance to radiation 
Unlike other organisms, cell survival in T. gammatolerans is not altered by changing conditions in its growth phase, but the lack of ideal conditions and nutrients decreases its radioresistance.
The system of chromosomal DNA repair shows that cells in stationary phase of growth reconstitute  DNA more rapidly than cells in exponential growth phase.
T. gammatolerans can slowly or quickly rebuild damaged chromosomes without loss of viability.

Applications 
A study has been conducted of its application to the development of new enzymatic markers that are resistant to high temperatures and their application in the study of carcinogenesis and the study of the development of mitochondrial diseases.  DNA repair mechanisms of T. gammatolerans could be incorporated into the genome of higher species to improve DNA repair and reduce cellular aging.

Etymology
Thermococcus: Greek feminine noun thermê (θέρμη), heat; new Latin masculine noun coccus (from Greek masculine noun kokkos (κόκκος), berry), coccus; new Latin masculine noun Thermococcus, coccus existing in hot environment.
gammatolerans: Gr. gamma (γάμμα), referring to gamma rays; Latin participle adjective tolerans, tolerating; Neolatin participle adjective gammatolerans, referring to its ability to tolerate high levels of γ-rays.

References

Further reading

External links
Type strain of Thermococcus gammatolerans at BacDive -  the Bacterial Diversity Metadatabase

Euryarchaeota
Archaea described in 2003
Radiodurants
Sulphophiles
Thermophiles